The 10 Metre was a sailing event on the Sailing at the 1912 Summer Olympics program in Nynäshamn.  Two races were scheduled plus eventual sail-off's. 28 sailors, on 4 boats, from 3 nation entered.

Race schedule

Course area and course configuration 
For the 10-Metre Course A was used.

Weather conditions

Final results 
The 1912 Olympic scoring system was used. All competitors were male.

Daily standings

Notes 
In the 10 Metre was chosen for this Olympics above the 7 Metre since 10 Metre outnumbered the 7 Metre in boats build.

Other information

Prizes 
The following Commemorative Plaque were handed out by the Royal Swedish Yacht Club to the owners of:

Further reading

References 

Sailing at the 1912 Summer Olympics
10 Metre